Unirea is a commune in Călărași County, Muntenia, Romania. It is composed of two villages, Unirea and Oltina.

References

Communes in Călărași County
Localities in Muntenia